Michael Sisti is the women's ice hockey current head coach at Mercyhurst University.  Since 1999, he has coached Mercyhurst to 4 Frozen Four appearances, 15 College Hockey America (CHA) post-season titles, and 1 Great Lakes Women's Hockey Association (GLWHA) post-season title. He reached 500 wins in 2020, becoming only the second coach in Division I women's college hockey to achieve that milestone. In 2018, he was inducted into the Erie Hall of Fame.

Personal life
Sisti is a native of Buffalo, New York.  He graduated from Canisius College in 1991.  He holds numerous scoring records at Canisius, and is a 2002 inductee in the Canisius Athletic Hall of Fame.

Coaching
After graduation, he was an assistant coach for Canisius men's program, and came to Mercyhurst in 1993 as an assistant coach on the men's team.  In 1999, Sisti became the Head Coach of the newly formed women's varsity team.  To date, he has been the only Head Coach of the program. 

Sisti's team reached the NCAA Tournament each year from 2005 through 2014.  The 10 consecutive appearances are an NCAA Division I record.  In 2009, Mercyhurst reached the NCAA Championship game, losing to Wisconsin 5–0, in their first of four Frozen Four seasons. 

Mercyhurst teams have won fifteen conference championships, with Sisti as head coach.   

On December 11th 2020, Sisti reached the 500 win milestone as head coach, when Mercyhurst defeated RIT by a score of 5–1.  Only one other head coach, Wisconsin's Mark Johnson, has achieved this milestone in Division I women's college ice hockey. Sisti is the 30th coach in the history of college hockey to earn 500 wins.

Awards and recognition 
AHCA Coach of the Year award, 2005. 

USCHO Coach of the Year, 2007

Erie Sports Hall of Fame, inducted 2018

Head coaching record

References

Living people
Mercyhurst Lakers women's ice hockey coaches
Year of birth missing (living people)
Sportspeople from Buffalo, New York